Mori Kazakh Autonomous County is a county within the Xinjiang Uyghur Autonomous Region and is under the administration of the Changji Hui Autonomous Prefecture. It contains an area of 13,510 km2. According to the 2002 census, it has a population of 90,000.

Climate

References

Kazak autonomous counties
County-level divisions of Xinjiang
Changji Hui Autonomous Prefecture